AC-15 may refer to:
 AC-15, the IEC Utilization categories indicating the type of electrical load
 AC-15, one of the first guitar amplifiers designed by Vox
 Autovía AC-15, a Spanish highway in the province of A Coruña, Galicia
 Honda AC15, a retro style single cylinder motorcycle
  USS Brutus (AC-15), former steamer Peter Jebsen, a collier in the United States Navy